Tyspanodes flavolimbalis is a moth in the family Crambidae. It was described by Snellen in 1895. It is found in Indonesia (Sumatra, Java).

References

Moths described in 1895
Spilomelinae
Moths of Indonesia